This is a list of the published fiction and non-fiction works of British author Susan Hill.

Novels 
 The Enclosure, Hutchinson 1961
 Do Me a Favour, Hutchinson 1963
 Gentleman and Ladies, Hamish Hamilton 1968; Penguin Paperback 1970
 A Change for the Better, Hamish Hamilton 1969; Penguin Paperback 1971
 I'm the King of the Castle, Hamish Hamilton 1970; Penguin Paperback 1972 (winner of the Somerset Maugham Award)
 Strange Meeting, Hamish Hamilton 1971; Penguin Paperback 1974
 The Bird of Night, Hamish Hamilton 1972; Penguin Paperback 1973 (shortlisted for the Booker Prize)
 In the Springtime of the Year, Hamish Hamilton 1973; Penguin Paperback 1974
 The Woman in Black - A Ghost Story, Hamish Hamilton Penguin Paperback 1983; Mandarin Paperback 1989; Vintage Paperback 1999
 Air and Angels, Sinclair Stevenson 1991; Mandarin Paperback 1993; Vintage 1999
 The Mist in the Mirror: A Ghost Story, Hamish Hamilton 1992; Mandarin paperback 1993; Vintage 1999
 Mrs de Winter, Sinclair Stevenson 1993; Mandarin Paperback 1994; Vintage 1999
 The Service of Clouds, Chatto & Windus 1998; Vintage 1999
 Simon Serrailler crime novels:
 The Various Haunts of Men, Vintage, 2005
 The Pure in Heart, Vintage, 2006
 The Risk of Darkness, Chatto & Windus, 2006 
 The Vows of Silence, Chatto & Windus, 2008
 Shadows in the Streets, 2010
 The Betrayal of Trust, 2011
 A Question of Identity, 2012
 The Soul of Discretion, 2014
 The Comforts of Home, 2018
 The Benefit of Hindsight, 2019
 A Change of Circumstance, 2021
 The Man in the Picture: A Ghost Story, 2007 Profile Books
 The Beacon, 2008 Chatto and Windus
 The Small Hand: A Ghost Story, 2010. Profile Books
 A Kind Man, 2011
 Dolly: A Ghost Story, 2012. Profile Books Ltd. 
 Black Sheep, 2013. Chatto and Windus (144p)
 From the Heart, 2017 Chatto and Windus

Short story collections 
 The Albatross and other stories, Hamish Hamilton 1970; Penguin 1972
 A Bit of Singing and Dancing, Hamish Hamilton 1973; Penguin 1974
 Listening to the Orchestra, Long Barn Books 1997
 The Boy Who Taught the Beekeeper to Read, Chatto and Windus July 2003
 Farthing House : And Other Stories, Long Barn Books, 2006
 The Travelling Bag and Other Ghostly Stories, Profile Books, Sep 2016

Chapbook 
 The Custodian, Covent Garden Press 1972

Non fiction
 The Magic Apple Tree, (autobiography) Hamish Hamilton, 1982; Penguin 1985; Long Barn Books 1998
 Through the Kitchen Window, Illustrated by Angela Barrett, Hamish Hamilton 1984; Penguin 1986
 Through the Garden Gate, (Illustrated by Angela Barrett), Hamish Hamilton, 1986
 The Lighting of the Lamps, (Collected pieces) Hamish Hamilton, 1987
 Shakespeare Country, (photographs by Talbot and Whiteman) Michael Joseph, 1987
 The Spirit of the Cotswolds, (photographs by Nick Meers), Michael Joseph, 1988
 Family, (Autobiography) Michael Joseph, 1989
 Reflections from a Garden, (Illustrated by Ian Stephens; written with Rory Stuart) Pavilion Books 1995
 Howards End is on the Landing Profile Books, 2009
 Jacob's Room is Full of Books: A Year of Reading , Profile Books, 2017

Plays
 The Cold Country and Other Plays for Radio (includes The End of Summer, Lizard in the Grass, Consider the Lilies, Strip Jack Naked); London, BBC Publications, 1975.
 Lizard in the Grass, broadcast 1971; produced Edinburgh, 1988
 On the Face of It, broadcast 1975; published in Act 1, edited by David Self and Ray Speakman, London, Hutchinson, 1979
 The Ramshackle Company (for children); produced London, 1981
 Chances, broadcast 1981; produced London, 1983.

Children's stories 
 One Night at a Time, Hamish Hamilton 1984; Puffin 1986
 Mother's Magic, Hamish Hamilton 1985; Puffin 1986
 Can it be True?; (illustrated by Angela Barrett) Hamish Hamilton 1987; Puffin 1988; Walker Books 1990
 Susie's Shoes, (illustrated by Priscilla Lamont), Hamish Hamilton 1989; Puffin 1990
 Stories from Codling Village, (illustrated by Caroline Crosland) Walker Books 1990 
 I've Forgotten Edward,  Walker Books and Sainsburys 1990
 I Won't Go there Again, Walker Books 1990
 Pirate Poll (illustrated by Priscilla Lamont), Hamish Hamilton 1991; Puffin 1992
 The Glass Angels, Walker Books 1991, Paperback 1993 
 Beware, Beware, (illustrated by Angela Barrett), Walker Books 1993, Paperback 1994
 King of King's, (illustratedb by John Lawrence), Walker Books 1994
 The Christmas Collection: An Anthology (illustrated: John Lawrence), Walker Books 1995
 The Battle for Gullywith'', 2008

References

External links

Bibliographies by writer
Bibliographies of British writers
Children's literature bibliographies
Fantasy bibliographies